Tommy is a 2014 Swedish crime thriller film directed by Tarik Saleh. The film premiered as the closing film of the Gothenburg Film Festival on February 1, 2014, and was later released in Sweden on March 14, 2014. It stars Moa Gammel, Ola Rapace, and Swedish singer Lykke Li in her acting debut. Li also contributed to the film's soundtrack with the song "Du är den ende".

Premise
After a year abroad Estelle (Moa Gammel) returns home to collect her husband’s share of the loot from a major robbery.

Cast
Moa Gammel as Estelle
Lykke Li Zachrisson as Blanca
Ola Rapace as Bobby
Johan Rabaeus as Steve
Ewa Fröling as Katarina
Alexej Manvelov as Matte
Ingela Olsson as Marianne Löfgren
Amanda Ooms as Lena
Inez Buckner as Isabel

References

External links
 
 

2014 films
2014 crime thriller films
2010s Swedish-language films
Films about murder
Films directed by Tarik Saleh
Swedish crime thriller films
2010s Swedish films